The Bahrain International Airshow is a biennial airshow hosted at the Sakhir Air Base in the Kingdom of Bahrain. The event is organised by the Civil Aviation Affairs of Bahrain in association with Farnborough International, and is sponsored by Gulf Air and Batelco.

Since its inception in 2010, the airshow has drawn hundreds of companies and tens of thousands of visitors.

References

External links
Official website

Air shows
Biennial events
Events in Bahrain
2010 establishments in Bahrain
Recurring events established in 2010